In accelerator physics, emittance is a property of a charged particle beam. It refers to the area occupied by the beam in a position-and-momentum phase space.

Each particle in a beam can be described by its position and momentum along each of three orthogonal axes, for a total of six position and momentum coordinates.  When the position and momentum for a single axis are plotted on a two dimensional graph, the average spread of the coordinates on this plot are the emittance. As such, a beam will have three emittances, one along each axis, which can be described independently.  As particle momentum along an axis is usually described as an angle relative to that axis, an area on a position-momentum plot will have dimensions of length × angle (for example, millimeters × milliradian).

Emittance is important for analysis of particle beams. As long as the beam is only subjected to conservative forces,  Liouville's Theorem shows that emittance is a conserved quantity. If the distribution over phase space is represented as a cloud in a plot (see figure), emittance is the area of the cloud. A variety of more exact definitions handle the fuzzy borders of the cloud and the case of a cloud that does not have an elliptical shape. In addition, the emittance along each axis is independent unless the beam passes through beamline elements (such as solenoid magnets) which correlate them. 

A low-emittance particle beam is a beam where the particles are confined to a small distance and have nearly the same momentum, which is a desirable property for ensuring that the entire beam is transported to its destination.  In a colliding beam accelerator, keeping the emittance small means that the likelihood of particle interactions will be greater resulting in higher luminosity.  In a synchrotron light source, low emittance means that the resulting x-ray beam will be small, and result in higher brightness.

Definitions

The coordinate system used to describe the motion of particles in an accelerator has three orthogonal axes, but rather than being centered on a fixed point in space, they are oriented with respect to the trajectory of an "ideal" particle moving through the accelerator with no deviation from the intended speed, position, or direction. Motion along this design trajectory is referred to as the longitudinal axis, and the two axes perpendicular to this trajectory (usually oriented horizontally and vertically) are referred to as transverse axes.

Emittance has units of length, but is usually referred to as "length × angle", for example, "millimeter × milliradians".  It can be measured in all three spatial dimensions.

Geometric transverse emittance 

When a particle moves through a circular accelerator or storage ring, the position  and angle  of the particle in the x direction will trace an ellipse in  phase space.

However, many sources will move the factor of  into the units of emittance rather than including the specific value, giving units of "length × angle × ."

This formula is the single particle emittance, which describes the area enclosed by the trajectory of a single particle in phase space.  However, emittance is more useful as a description of the collective properties of the particles in a beam, rather than of a single particle.  Since beam particles are not necessarily distributed uniformly in phase space, definitions of emittance for an entire beam will be based on the area of the ellipse required to enclose a specific fraction of the beam particles.  

The equation for the emittance of a Gaussian beam is:

The value chosen for  will depend on the application and the author, and a number of different choices exist in the literature. Some common choices and their equivalent definition of emittance are: 

{| class="wikitable"
|-
!  !! 
|-
|  || 0.15
|-
|  || 0.39
|-
|  || 0.87
|-
|  || 0.95
|}

While the x and y axes are generally equivalent mathematically, in horizontal rings where the x coordinate represents the plane of the ring, consideration of dispersion can be added to the equation of the emittance. Because the magnetic force of a bending magnet is dependent on the energy of the particle being bent, particles of different energies will be bent along different trajectories through the magnet, even if their initial position and angle are the same.  The effect of this dispersion on the beam emittance is given by:

(This definition assumes F=0.15)

Longitudinal emittance 
The geometrical definition of longitudinal emittance is more complex than that of transverse emittance. This deviation can be expressed in terms of distance along the reference trajectory, time of flight along the reference trajectory (how "early" or "late" the particle is compared to the reference), or phase (for a specified reference frequency).

In turn, the  coordinate is generally not expressed as an angle.  Since  represents the change in z over time, it corresponds to the forward motion of the particle.  This can be given in absolute terms, as a velocity, momentum, or energy, or in relative terms, as a fraction of the position, momentum, or energy of the reference particle. 

However, the fundamental concept of emittance is the same—the position of the particles are plotted along one axis of a phase space plot, the rate of change in that position over time is plotted on the other axis, and the emittance is a measure of the area occupied on that plot.

One possible definition of longitudinal emittance is given by:

where the integral is taken along a path  which tightly encloses the beam particles in  phase space.  Here  is the reference frequency and the longitudinal coordinate  is the phase of the particles relative to a reference particle. Longitudinal equations such as this one often must be solved numerically, rather than analytically.

RMS emittance 

The geometric definition of emittance assumes that the distribution of particles in phase space can be reasonably well characterized by an ellipse.  In addition, the definitions using the root mean square of the particle distribution assume a Gaussian particle distribution.

In cases where these assumptions do not hold, it is still possible to define a beam emittance using the moments of the distribution. Here, the RMS emittance is defined to be,

where  is the variance of the particle's position,  is the variance of the angle a particle makes with the direction of travel in the accelerator ( with  along the direction of travel), and  represents an angle-position correlation of particles in the beam.  This definition is equivalent to the geometric emittance in the case of an elliptical particle distribution in phase space.

The emittance may also be expressed as the determinant of the variance-covariance matrix of the beam's phase space coordinates where it becomes clear that quantity describes an effective area occupied by the beam in terms of its second order statistics.

Depending on context, some definitions of RMS emittance will add a scaling factor to correspond to a fraction of the total distribution, to facilitate comparison with geometric emittances using the same fraction.

RMS emittance in higher dimensions 
The RMS emittance generalizes to full three dimensional space as shown:

In the absences of correlations between different axes in the particle accelerator, most of these matrix elements become zero and we are left with a product of the emittance along each axis.

Normalized emittance 
Although the previous definitions of emittance remain constant for linear beam transport, they do change when the particles undergo acceleration (an effect called adiabatic damping).  In some applications, such as for linear accelerators, photoinjectors, and the accelerating sections of larger systems, it becomes important to compare beam quality across different energies.  Normalized emittance, which is invariant under acceleration, is used for this purpose.  

Normalized emittance in one dimension is given by:

Normalized emittance is related to the previous definitions of emittance through  and the normalized velocity in the direction of the beam's travel:

The normalized emittance does not change as a function of energy and so can be used to indicate beam degradation if the particles are accelerated. For speeds close to the speed of light, where  is close to one, the emittance is approximately inversely proportional to the energy. In this case, the physical width of the beam will vary inversely with the square root of the energy.

Higher dimensional versions of the normalized emittance can be defined in analogy to the RMS version by replacing all angles with their corresponding momenta.

Measurement of Emittance

Quadrupole Scan Technique 
One of the most fundamental methods of measuring beam emittance is the quadrupole scan method. The emittance of the beam for a particular plane of interest (i.e., horizontal or  vertical) can be obtained by varying the field strength of a quadrupole (or quadrupoles) upstream of a monitor (i.e., a wire or a screen).

The properties of a beam can be described as the following beam matrix.

where  is the derivative of x with respect to the longitudinal coordinate. The forces experienced by the beam as it travels down the beam line and passes through the quadrupole(s) are described using the transfer matrix (referenced to transfer maps page)  of the beam line, including the quadrupole(s) and other beam line components such as drifts:

During the quadrupole scan process,  and  stay constant, and  changes with the field strength of the quadrupole(s).

The final beam when it reaches the monitor screen at distance s from its original position can be described as another beam matrix :

The final beam matrix  can be calculated from the original beam matrix  by doing matrix multiplications with the beam line transfer matrix :

Now, focusing on the (1,1) element of the final beam matrix throughout the matrix multiplications, we get the equation:

Here the middle term has a factor of 2 because .

Which is a quadratic equation of the variable . Since the RMS emittance RMS is defined to be the following.

The RMS emittance of the original beam can be calculated using its beam matrix elements:

To obtain the emittance measurement, the following procedure is employed:

 The beam propagates through the varied beam line, and is observed at the monitor screen, where the beam size  is measured.
 Calculate RMS emittance of the original beam: 

If the length of the quadrupole is short compared to its focal length , where  is the field strength of the quadrupole, its transfer matrix  can be approximated by the thin lens approximation:

Then the RMS emittance can be calculated by fitting a parabola to values of measured beam size  versus quadrupole strength .

By adding additional quadrupoles, this technique can be extended to a full 4-D reconstruction.

Mask-Based Reconstruction 

Another fundamental method for measuring emittance is by using a predefined mask to imprint a pattern on the beam and sample the remaining beam at a screen downstream.  Two such masks are pepper pots and TEM grids.  A schematic of the TEM grid measurement is shown below.

By using the knowledge of the spacing of the features in the mask one can extract information about the beam size at the mask plane.  By measuring the spacing between the same features on the sampled beam downstream, one can extract information about the angles in the beam.  The quantities of merit can be extracted as described in Marx et al.

The choice of mask is generally dependent on the charge of the beam; low-charge beams are better suited to the TEM grid mask over the pepper pot, as more of the beam is transmitted.

Emittance of electrons versus heavy particles 

To understand why the RMS emittance takes on a particular value in a storage ring, one needs to distinguish between electron storage rings and storage rings with heavier particles (such as protons).  In an electron storage ring, radiation is an important effect, whereas when other particles are stored, it is typically a small effect.  When radiation is important, the particles undergo radiation damping (which slowly decreases emittance turn after turn) and quantum excitation causing diffusion which leads to an equilibrium emittance.  When no radiation is present, the emittances remain constant (apart from impedance effects and intrabeam scattering).  In this case, the emittance is determined by the initial particle distribution.  In particular if one injects a "small" emittance, it remains small, whereas if one injects a "large" emittance, it remains large.

Acceptance 
The acceptance, also called admittance, is the maximum emittance that a beam transport system or analyzing system is able to transmit. This is the size of the chamber transformed into phase space and does not suffer from the ambiguities of the definition of beam emittance.

Conservation of emittance 
Lenses can focus a beam, reducing its size in one transverse dimension while increasing its angular spread, but cannot change the total emittance. This is a result of Liouville's theorem. Ways of reducing the beam emittance include radiation damping, stochastic cooling, and electron cooling.

Emittance and brightness
Emittance is also related to the brightness of the beam.  In microscopy brightness is very often used, because it includes the current in the beam and most systems are circularly symmetric. Consider the brightness of the incident beam at the sample,

where  indicates the beam current and  represents the total emittance of the incident beam and  the wavelength of the incident electron.

The intrinsic emittance , describing a normal distribution in the initial phase space, is diffused by the emittance introduced by aberrations . The total emittance is approximately the sum in quadrature. Under the assumption of uniform illumination of the aperture with current per unit angle , we have the following emittance-brightness relation,

See also
Accelerator Physics
Thermal Emittance / Mean Transverse Energy
Etendue

References

Accelerator physics